The Texas Rangers 1987 season involved the Rangers finishing sixth in the American League West with a record of 75 wins and 87 losses.

Offseason
December 18, 1986: Mike Jeffcoat was signed as a free agent with the Texas Rangers.

Regular season
Rubén Sierra set the Rangers' club record for extra base hits (69) in one season. He became the youngest player in the American League to get 100 RBIs in a season since Al Kaline in 1956.

Season standings

Record vs. opponents

Transactions
 June 2, 1987: 1987 Major League Baseball draft
Bill Haselman was drafted by the Rangers in the first round (23rd pick).
Scott Coolbaugh was drafted by the Rangers in the third round. Player signed June 18, 1987.
Kevin Belcher was drafted by the Rangers in the sixth round.

Roster

Player stats

Batting

Starters by position
Note: Pos = Position; G = Games played; AB = At bats; H = Hits; Avg. = Batting average; HR = Home runs; RBI = Runs batted in

Other batters
Note: G = Games played; AB = At bats; H = Hits; Avg. = Batting average; HR = Home Runs; RBI = Runs batted in

Pitching

Starting pitchers
Note: G = Games pitched; IP = Innings pitched; W = Wins; L = Losses; ERA = Earned run average; SO = Strikeouts

Other pitchers
Note: G = Games pitched; IP = Innings pitched; W = Wins; L = Losses; ERA = Earned run average; SO = Strikeouts

Relief pitchers
Note: G = Games pitched; W = Wins; L = Losses; SV = Saves; ERA = Earned run average; SO = Strikeouts

Awards and honors
 Rubén Sierra, American League Leader At-Bats (643)
All-Star Game

Farm system

References

1987 Texas Rangers at Baseball Reference
1987 Texas Rangers at Baseball Almanac

Texas Rangers seasons
Texas Rang
Texas Rangers